Esteban Gabriel Giambuzzi (born 30 May 1989) is an Argentine professional footballer who plays as a right-back for US Anconitana.

Career
Giambuzzi's career began with Almagro. He participated in forty-eight fixtures for the Primera B Metropolitana outfit, whilst also netting goals against Colegiales and Nueva Chicago respectively. In June 2011, Giambuzzi moved across the division to Comunicaciones. He scored in consecutive fixtures in September versus Los Andes and Acassuso, as he appeared twenty-five times in the 2012–13 campaign. Another two goals came in season two, which preceded Giambuzzi signing for Deportivo Morón ahead of 2013–14. He'd appear eighteen times for them, as he was sent off in his final match versus Defensores de Belgrano.

Colegiales signed Giambuzzi on 31 July 2014. Five goals occurred across 2014 and 2015. Giambuzzi subsequently had spells with Defensores de Belgrano and Sportivo Italiano, notably scoring seven times for the latter in Primera C Metropolitana. August 2017 saw Giambuzzi join Ricardo Caruso Lombardi's Tigre. His bow arrived in the Primera División on 22 September versus Belgrano, as he arrived off the bench in place of Daniel Imperiale; two further appearances in games with River Plate and Rosario Central, where he suffered a knee injury, occurred. On 24 July 2018, Giambuzzi agreed terms to return to Colegiales.

In July 2019, Giambuzzi joined Italian Eccellenza Marche club US Anconitana. He scored five goals in twenty-three fixtures in 2019–20.

Career statistics
.

References

External links

1989 births
Living people
People from San Martín, Buenos Aires
Argentine footballers
Association football defenders
Argentine expatriate footballers
Expatriate footballers in Italy
Argentine expatriate sportspeople in Italy
Primera B Metropolitana players
Primera C Metropolitana players
Argentine Primera División players
Eccellenza players
Club Almagro players
Club Comunicaciones footballers
Deportivo Morón footballers
Club Atlético Colegiales (Argentina) players
Defensores de Belgrano footballers
Sportivo Italiano footballers
Club Atlético Tigre footballers
Sportspeople from Buenos Aires Province